Jean Deloffre (born 5 October 1939) is a French former professional footballer and manager. As a player, he was a midfielder, and he represented the France national team in 1967.

Managerial career
Deloffre coached Grenoble and Vittel after his playing career.

Honours 
Lens

 Coupe Charles Drago: 1959, 1960, 1965

Angers

 Division 2: 1968–69

Nice

 Division 2: 1969–70
 Challenge des Champions: 1970

References

External links
 Player profile at FFF
 Player profile
 Player profile

1939 births
Living people
French footballers
France international footballers
RC Lens players
Angers SCO players
OGC Nice players
Angoulême Charente FC players
Paris Saint-Germain F.C. players
Grenoble Foot 38 players
Ligue 1 players
Ligue 2 players
French football managers
Grenoble Foot 38 managers
SC Abbeville players
Footballers from Hauts-de-France
Association football midfielders
Sportspeople from Somme (department)
AC Avignonnais players
Bulgnéville Contrex Vittel FC managers